Swarthmore station is a SEPTA Regional Rail station in Swarthmore, Pennsylvania. Located on Chester Road between downtown Swarthmore and Swarthmore College, it serves the Media/Wawa Line.

In 2013, this station saw 765 boardings and 699 alightings on an average weekday. Dollar-a-day parking and permit parking are available.  It is the first outward-bound Zone 3 station from the central Philadelphia stations. It is the busiest station on the Media/Wawa Line outside of Center City. The adult fare to and from Central Philadelphia is currently $5 during off-peak hours, with an additional $2 surcharge assessed for those who buy a ticket on the train, regardless of whether the ticket window is open.

The ticket office is located on the inbound side of the tracks in a building used otherwise by Swarthmore College and the Chester Children's Chorus. The building was originally built in 1880 by the Pennsylvania Railroad and formerly held the Jumping Cow cafe. Swarthmore's main street, Chester Road, has passed under the station since 1931. Before Swarthmore College was opened, the station was known as Westdale.

Station layout
Swarthmore has two low-level side platforms.

Bibliography

References

External links

 Swarthmore Station | SEPTA
 Images of the original Pennsylvania Railroad Station in Swarthmore
 Station from Google Maps Street View

SEPTA Regional Rail stations
Stations on the West Chester Line
Former Pennsylvania Railroad stations
Railway stations in Pennsylvania at university and college campuses
Swarthmore, Pennsylvania
Railway stations in the United States opened in 1854
1854 establishments in Pennsylvania